Thisted County is a former province in Denmark, located on the north-westernmost part of the country It encompassed the westernmost part of the island of Vendsyssel-Thy. It was dissolved in 1970 when the bulk of it was merged into Viborg County while other regions joined the counties of Ringkjøbing and North Jutland.

Thisted County featured the market towns (købstæder) of Nykøbing Mors and Thisted.

1970 administrative reform
Thisted County was dissolved in the 1970 administrative reform and the county was divided into municipalities belonging to three counties:

North Jutland County (north eastern region)
Fjerritslev
Ringkjøbing County (south eastern region)
Thyholm
Viborg County (all other territories)
Hanstholm
Morsø
Sydthy
Thisted

List of former hundreds (herreder)
Hassing Herred
Hillerslev Herred
Hundborg Herred
Morsø Nørre Herred
Morsø Sønder Herred
Refs Herred
Vester Han Herred

See also
 Thisted

This article incorporates material from the corresponding article on the Danish Wikipedia, accessed 1 May 2007.

Counties of Denmark dissolved in 1970
Thisted Municipality